Peter Grant VC (1824 – 10 January 1868) was a British Army soldier and an Irish recipient of the Victoria Cross, the highest award for gallantry in the face of the enemy that can be awarded to British and Commonwealth forces.

Victoria Cross action
Grant was about 33 years old, and a private in the 93rd Regiment of Foot (later The Argyll and Sutherland Highlanders (Princess Louise's)) during the Indian Mutiny when the following deed took place on 16 November 1857 at the Secundra Bagh, Lucknow, for which he was awarded the VC: 

He died from drowning in the River Tay in Dundee, Scotland on 10 January 1868.

References

External links
Location of grave and VC medal (Tayside)
Memorial dedication

1824 births
1868 deaths
19th-century Irish people
Irish soldiers in the British Army
Irish recipients of the Victoria Cross
Indian Rebellion of 1857 recipients of the Victoria Cross
Argyll and Sutherland Highlanders soldiers
Deaths by drowning in the United Kingdom
British Army personnel of the Crimean War
British Army recipients of the Victoria Cross
Accidental deaths in Scotland
Irish military personnel